The Lebanese Women's Super Cup is an annual match contested between the champions of the previous Lebanese Women's Football League season and the holders of the Lebanese Women's FA Cup – designed as an equivalent to the Lebanese Super Cup. The competition began in 2015, with FC Beirut winning the first title.

List of finals

Performance by club

See also 
 Women's football in Lebanon
 Lebanese Women's Football League
 Lebanese Women's FA Cup
 Lebanese Super Cup

References 

 
Lebanon
Super Cup
Recurring sporting events established in 2016
2016 establishments in Lebanon